The 2017–18 Odense Bulldogs season is the 27th season in the Danish Hockey League since the team was promoted in 1990.

Following a semifinal exit the year before, head coach Peter Johansson left the club along with other star players, such as 16/17 league leading goalie Tadeas Galansky. Two time topscorer Dale Mitchell, was the only foreign player to extend his contract, making it his fourth year in a row as a Bulldog.
Bulldogs signed 55-year old Finnish Kari Rauhanen as head coach. But after only ten regular season games, he decided to stop due to "personal matters". The board immediately hired Mikael Gath as new head coach.

Midway through the season, Bulldogs fired star-player Anthony Camara due to unacceptable behaviour.

Significant events

 September 23: The board presents a financial deficit on 1.5 million DKK.
 October 11: Head coach Kari Rauhanen quits his job due to personal reasons, and Mikael Gath was hired as new head coach.
 January 3: Anthony Camara gets fired due to unacceptable behaviour.
 February 12: Goaltender Robin Rahm leaves the club due to illness in near family. Hannu Toivonen signs as new goalie.
 February 27: The board presents that club desperately need one million DKK in one day to avoid bankruptcy.
 March 1: The board successfully reached 1.052.000 DKK before deadline.

Preseason

The preseason was scheduled for five games, from August 18 to September 1. It should have been six games, but was shortened to five because of a cancel from Gamyo d'Épinal. Odense were supposed to host a four team-tournament between themselves, Rungsted Seier Capital, Eispiraten Crimmitschau and of course Épinal. But the French team did not want to participate anyway, so the tournament was rescheduled to a three team-tournament.

Bulldogs won four out of their five pre-season games. The only loss was against Rødovre Mighty Bulls, were they lost 3–0 on away ice.

Schedule and results

Regular season

League table

Schedule and results 

The 2017–18 regular season schedule were published on July 5, 2017.

Player statistics
Updated 25 January

Skaters

Goaltenders

Player of the Month 
 September: Søren Nielsen
 October: Robin Rahm
 November: Dale Mitchell
 December: Yannick Vedel
 January: Robin Rahm
 February: Ned Lukacevic

References 

2017 in Danish sport
2018 in Danish sport